Ira James Murchison (February 6, 1933 – March 28, 1994) was an American athlete, winner of the gold medal in 4 × 100 m relay at the 1956 Summer Olympics.

Born in Chicago, Illinois, he attended Phillips High School. Murchison was noted for his exceptional speed from the starting block, which earned him a nickname Human Sputnik.

Before the Melbourne Olympics, Murchison equalled twice the 100 m world record of 10.2 and ran in Berlin a new world record of 10.1, thus becoming one of the favourites to win the 100 m Olympic gold medal. But at Melbourne, Murchison managed to finish only in a disappointing fourth place. He also ran the leadoff leg of the 4 × 100 m relay team for the United States, and helped the American team to a gold medal in a world record time of 39.5.

He attended the University of Iowa, but later transferred to Western Michigan. At the 1963 Pan American Games, Murchison finished third in the 100 m and helped the American 4 × 100 m relay team to win a gold medal.

During the 1970s, Murchison was the coach of a women's track team in Chicago. One of the women he coached was 1976 Olympic sprinter, Rosalyn Bryant.

Ira Murchison died of cancer in Harvey, Illinois, aged 61.

References
 

1933 births
1994 deaths
American male sprinters
Athletes (track and field) at the 1956 Summer Olympics
Athletes (track and field) at the 1963 Pan American Games
Olympic gold medalists for the United States in track and field
Track and field athletes from Chicago
Western Michigan University alumni
Medalists at the 1956 Summer Olympics
Pan American Games gold medalists for the United States
Pan American Games medalists in athletics (track and field)
USA Indoor Track and Field Championships winners
Medalists at the 1963 Pan American Games